Bruno Felipe (born 29 March 1964) is a French archer. He competed in the men's individual event at the 1992 Summer Olympics.

References

External links
 

1964 births
Living people
French male archers
Olympic archers of France
Archers at the 1992 Summer Olympics
Sportspeople from Seine-Saint-Denis